The Laurens Railroad was a  gauge shortline railroad that served the South Carolina Upstate region before, during and after the Civil War.

The line was started in 1854.

By 1861, the 32-mile line was carrying 8,500 passengers a day.

Among the line's presidents was Henry William Garlington (1811-1893), a planter who signed the South Carolina Ordinance of Secession in 1860.

The railroad apparently went out of business sometime after the Civil War.

By 1881 it had been reorganized and was operating as the Laurens Railway. It survived under that named until it was bought by the Columbia, Newberry and Laurens Railroad in 1894.

References

Defunct South Carolina railroads
Railway companies established in 1854
5 ft gauge railways in the United States
1854 establishments in South Carolina